The American Music Award for Favorite Artist – Latin has been awarded since 1998. On the list below, the year reflects the year in which the awards were presented for works released in the previous year (until 2003 onward when awards were handed out on November of the same year). The all-time winner in this category is Enrique Iglesias with 8 wins. He is also the most nominated artist with 12 nominations. For the 48th American Music Awards in 2020, the category was split into Favorite Male Artist – Latin and Favorite Female Artist – Latin in recognition of the increasing popularity of the Latin genre in the US.

Winners and nominees

1990s

2000s

2010s

2020s

Category facts

Multiple wins

 8 wins
 Enrique Iglesias

 5 wins
 Shakira

 3 wins
 Bad Bunny

 2 wins
 Marc Anthony
 Becky G
 Jennifer Lopez
 Ricky Martin

Multiple nominations

 12 nominations
 Enrique Iglesias

 8 nominations
 Shakira

 5 nominations
 Marc Anthony
 Daddy Yankee

 4 nominations
 Bad Bunny
 Ricky Martin

 3 nominations
 Becky G
 Karol G
 Jennifer Lopez
 Luis Miguel
 Romeo Santos
 Rosalía

 2 nominations
 Luis Fonsi
 Don Omar
 Kali Uchis
 Pitbull
 Wisin & Yandel

See also
 Latin American Music Awards

References

American Music Awards
Latin music awards
Awards established in 1998